Troubridge may refer to:


Persons
 Amelia Troubridge (born 1974), British photographer
 Edward Troubridge (c. 1787–1852), British Royal Navy rear admiral and politician
 Ernest Troubridge (1862–1926), British First World War Royal Navy admiral
 Laura, Lady Troubridge (1867–1946), British novelist
 Laura Troubridge (diarist) (1858–1929), British diarist, letter writer, and artist 
 Thomas Troubridge (disambiguation), several people
 Una Vincenzo, Lady Troubridge (1887–1963), British translator, wife of Ernest

Places
 Mount Troubridge, Victoria Land, Antarctica
 Troubridge Hill, South Australia
 Troubridge Island, South Australia
 Troubridge Point, South Australia
 Troubridge Shoals, South Australia

Ships
 , a Second World War British Royal Navy destroyer
 Hired armed ship Sir Thomas Troubridge or Troubridge, under contract with the Royal Navy from 1804 to 1806
 , a South Australian ferry
 Lucy Maria (1801 ship), named Troubridge between 1806 and around 1815

Other uses
 Troubridge baronets, a title in the Baronetage of Great Britain

See also
 Trubridge, a list of people with the surname
 Trowbridge (disambiguation)